Nabil Qaouk (Arabic:نبيل قاووق) is a member and deputy member of the executive council of Hezbollah.

Education
Qaouk studied religion in Qom and also attended military training in Iran.

Career
Qaouk is the top official in Southern Lebanon for Hezbollah. In addition, he is commander of Hezbollah and has the title of general. He is also deputy head of Hezbollah's executive council.

Attacks
Qaouk's offices in Tyre were hit by the Israeli Air Force during the 2006 Lebanon War in July 2006.

Personal life
Qaouk is married and has six children.

References

Living people
Hezbollah members
Year of birth missing (living people)